Crassispira ansonae is a species of sea snail, a marine gastropod mollusk in the family Pseudomelatomidae.

Description

Distribution
This marine species is endemic to Australia and occurs off Western Australia.

References

 Wells, F.E. 1990. Revision of the recent Australian Turridae referred to the genera Splendrillia and Austrodrillia. Journal of the Malacological Society of Australasia 11: 73–117
 Wilson, B. 1994. Australian marine shells. Prosobranch gastropods. Kallaroo, WA : Odyssey Publishing Vol. 2 370 pp.

External links
 

ansonae
Gastropods described in 1990
Gastropods of Australia